Ana Kordzaia-Samadashvili (born February 26, 1968) is a Georgian writer and literary journalist who authored some of the best-selling prose of post-Soviet Georgian literature.

Biography
Ana Kordzaia-Samadashvili was born in 1968 and lives in Tbilisi. She is a writer, translator and literary journalist. She has won many Georgian literary prizes including the Saba Prize, the IliaUni Literary Prize and the Goethe Institute Award.

Some of her works have been translated into English (Me, Margarita: Stories – Dalkey Archive Press ), German (Ich, Margarita – Verlag Hans Schiler ) and Swedish.

Selected works
Who Killed Chaika?, Bakur Sulakauri Publishing, 2013 
Marieta’s Way, Palitra L Publishing, 2012
Children of Nightfall, Bakur Sulaakuri Publishing, 2011 
Me, Margarita, Bakur Sulaakuri Publishing, 2005, 2015  
Berikaoba, Bakur Sulakauri Publishing, 2003

Literary prizes and awards
IliaUni Literary prize 2013 in the category "Best Novel" for Who Killed Chaika?
Literary Award SABA 2003 in the category "Best Debut" for Berikaoba 
Goethe Institute Prize 1999 in the category "Best Translation" for her translation of Die Liebhaberinnen by Elfriede Jelinek

References 

1968 births
Living people
Writers from Tbilisi
Postmodern writers
Women writers from Georgia (country)